Maj. Gen. Donald L. Owens (April 13, 1930 – May 2, 2012) served as Arizona's Adjutant General and Director of the Arizona Department of Emergency and Military Affairs.

Maj. Gen. Owens joined the Arizona Air National Guard as a private in 1952. During his career, he served as Commanding General of the Arizona Air National Guard and Commander of the 161st Air Refueling Wing, among other positions. He was named Adjutant General in 1983, and faithfully served in this role until his retirement in 1994. Maj. Gen. Owens was inducted into the Arizona Aviation Hall of Fame in 2010.

Arizona Governor Jan Brewer ordered flags be lowered to half-staff on the date of his interment, May 10, 2012.

References

2012 deaths
United States Air Force generals
1930 births
National Guard (United States) generals
State cabinet secretaries of Arizona